Stephan A. Hoeller is an American author, scholar, and neo-Gnostic bishop.

Career

An author and scholar of Gnosticism and Jungian psychology, Hoeller is Regionary Bishop of Ecclesia Gnostica.

Hoeller was ordained to the priesthood of the American Catholic Church by Bishop Lowell P. Wadle in 1958. He was consecrated to the Gnostic episcopate by Richard Duc de Palatine on April 9, 1967.  Ronald Powell (who took the ecclesiastical name Richard Jean Chretien Duc de Palatine) had established a modern-day Gnostic church, the Pre-Nicene Gnostic Catholic Church, in England during the 1950s - de Palatine received his successions from British independent prelate Hugh de Wilmott-Newman in 1953.   After the death of Duc de Palatine in the 1970s, Hoeller abbreviated the church's name, in Latin form, to Ecclesia Gnostica.  He has continued to serve as bishop of the Ecclesia Gnostica for over four decades.

Hoeller has lectured in Australia, New Zealand, England, Sweden, Norway, Iceland, Hungary, Germany, and the United States. He is a former member of the lecturing faculty of the late Manly P. Hall's Philosophical Research Society, and a national speaker for the Theosophical Society in America.  Since 1963 he has been Director of Studies for the Gnostic Society centered in Los Angeles, where he has lectured every Friday evening for many decades. He was a frequent contributor to Gnosis magazine; and has also written for Quest Magazine and for many professional journals.  He is Professor Emeritus of Comparative Religion at the College of Oriental Studies in Los Angeles, California.

Partial bibliography 
The Royal Road: A Manual of Kabalistic Meditations on the Tarot (1975),  Second Edition republished as: The Fool's Pilgrimage, Kabbalistic Meditations on the Tarot (2004) 
The Gnostic Jung and the Seven Sermons to the Dead (1982), 
Jung and the Lost Gospels (1989), 
Freedom: Alchemy for a Voluntary Society (1992), 
Gnosticism: New Light on the Ancient Tradition of Inner Knowing (2002), 
A Gnostic Catechism - Revised Edition (2020), 
The Mystery and Magic of the Eucharist - Revised Edition (2020),

Notes

External links 
 Audio lectures by Stephan Hoeller

Clergy from Budapest
Gnosticism
Hungarian expatriates in the United States
Year of birth missing (living people)
Living people
Historians of Gnosticism